Edino Krieger (17 March 1928 – 6 December 2022) was a Brazilian avant-garde composer, conductor, record producer and musical critic.

Life and career

During his career Krieger composed over 150 pieces, as well as songs (notably Vinicius de Moraes' "Fuga e antifuga"), incidental music and film scores. Among his best known works, it is the 1972 suite "Canticum Naturale", in which orchestra recreates Amazonian natural sounds.

Krieger died on 6 December 2022, at the age of 94.

References

Further reading

External links 

Edino Krieger at Gran Enciclopèdia de la Música
Edino Krieger at Enciclopédia Itaú Cultural

 

1928 births
2022 deaths
People from Santa Catarina (state)
Brazilian classical composers
Recipients of the Order of Cultural Merit (Brazil)